Josh Bartel (born 23 April 1985) is a professional Canadian football punter who is currently a free agent. He has played for the Hamilton Tiger-Cats, Saskatchewan Roughriders, and BC Lions of the Canadian Football League (CFL).

Before going to the CFL, Bartel played Australian Rules Football for the Wodonga Football Club.

Australian Rules Football career
In June 2010, Bartel quit Wodonga to pursue a gridiron football career in North America.

Professional career
Bartel joined the Hamilton Tiger-Cats of the Canadian Football League in 2012 after leaving Australia and failing to make a National Football League team. Under rules in place at the time, Bartel was considered a "non-import" player because he received his football training in Canada. The rules changed after 31 May 2014, but Bartel was grandfathered in as a "National Player".

In 2012, his first season in the CFL, Bartel punted for 4,985 yards on 116 punts, an average of 43.0 yards per punt, and was named an East Division All-Star.

In 2013, Bartel punted for 4,897 yards on 112 punts, bringing his average up to 43.7 yards per punt. Bartel was again named an East Division All-Star in 2013.

On 17 February 2014, Bartel was traded to the Saskatchewan Roughriders. The 2014 season saw him punt for 4,616 yards on 106 punts, an average of 43.5 yards per punt.

He returned to Australia for the 2015 season, but on 21 January 2016, the Saskatchewan Roughriders announced that Bartel had signed a contract to play for the 2016 season. He punted 134 times for 6,046 yards, an average of 45.1 yards per punt.

On 1 March 2017, Bartel signed a contract extension with the Roughriders that carried through the 2019 CFL season. However, following the signing of Jon Ryan, Bartel was released on 14 May 2019.

On 8 July 2019, it was announced that Bartel had signed with the BC Lions.

Personal life
In Australia, Bartel had a job lined up selling car tires but instead came to Canada to punt in the CFL.

Bartel's cousin, Jimmy, played for the Geelong Cats in the Australian Football League from 2002 to 2016

References

External links

BC Lions bio
Saskatchewan Roughriders bio 
CBC Profile
CFL Profile

1985 births
Living people
American football placekickers
American football punters
Australian emigrants to Canada
Australian expatriate sportspeople in Canada
Australian players of Canadian football
BC Lions players
Canadian football placekickers
Canadian football punters
Hamilton Tiger-Cats players
People from Wodonga
Saskatchewan Roughriders players
Sportsmen from Victoria (Australia)
Wodonga Football Club players